Kenchalagudu is a small village near manandavadi road Mysore city in Karnataka province of India.

Location
Kenchalagudu is located on Mysore-Mananthavady road and it is very near the outer ring road of Mysore. The village is 15 km away from Mysore railway station.

Demographics
There are 551 people living in this village. Children below six years make up 14 per cent of the population. The literacy level is 68%. Female literacy rate is only 61%. There are a total of 104 houses in the village.

Major Landmarks
Kali Yuva Mane, a special non-profit school meant for underprivileged children is located in this village. This school is run by Divya Deepa Charitable Trust, Mysore.

See also
 Divya Deepa Charitable Trust
 Kaliyuva Mane School, Mysore

Image Gallery

References

Villages in Mysore district